Splash Lake is an action puzzle strategy game developed by Bits Laboratory and published by NEC Avenue for the PC Engine in 1991. Later the game was ported to the TurboGrafx-16 CD add-on unit by Turbo Technologies Inc. in 1992.

Gameplay 
In this game, the player takes control of an ostrich that is able to navigate tiles suspended over a lake. Each round consists of a single screen play area with differently arranged tiles and enemies. The player must entrap enemies onto an area of the tile grid and then crack the tiles to make the enemies fall into the water. If the player is hit by an enemy, the player loses a hit point. If the player falls into the water or runs out of hit points, a life is lost and the level starts over. When all enemies are dumped into the lake, the player wins and moves on to the next level. Players can move in 4 directions and use the action buttons to crack a tile or jump over obstacles and enemies.

The game consists of approximately 60 levels, including boss levels. The game can be played single or two player. Every 10 levels there is a light hearted animated cutscene.

Reception 
This game has received average to positive reviews since its release. A reviewer for Defunct Games gave the game a B− citing the games visual appeal, but was critical of the games quickly ramped up difficulty and noted that the game's soundtrack was not much better than was done on Hucard games. Gamezero gave the game an 18.5/20 citing challenging gameplay but mediocre graphics and sound.

References 

1991 video games
Puzzle video games
Top-down video games
TurboGrafx-16 games
TurboGrafx-CD games
Video games about birds
Video games developed in Japan
Single-player video games